The third USS Canonicus (YT-187) was a United States Navy harbor tug which entered service in 1941 and was discarded in 1947.

It was built in Beaumont, Texas as the Thomas E. Moran for the Moran Towing Co., and purchased from them by the navy on 1 May 1941. Renamed Canonicus, it was placed in service on 3 June 1941. It served in the 1st Naval District and 5th Naval District.

Canonicus was transferred to the Maritime Commission for disposal on 30 April 1947, and was repurchased by Moran Towing, becoming the Mary Moran. It ultimate fate is unknown.

References
 
 

Tugs of the United States Navy
World War II auxiliary ships of the United States